Villeneuve-le-Roi station (French: Gare de Villeneuve-le-Roi) is a railway station in Villeneuve-le-Roi, Val-de-Marne, Île-de-France, France. The station was opened on 29 May 1914 and is on the Paris–Bordeaux railway. The station is served by the RER Line C, which is operated by SNCF. The station serves the commune of Villeneuve-le-Roi.

Station info
Built at an altitude at 39 meters above sea level, the station is on the 12.405 kilometer point of the Paris–Bordeaux railway, between the stations of Choisy-le-Roi and Ablon. The station served 1,490,400 passengers in 2014.

Train services
The following services serve the station:

Local services (RER C) Juvisy – Villeneuve-le-Roi – Bibliothèque François Mitterrand – Invalides – Champs-de-Mars Tour Eiffel – Viroflay-Rive-Gauche – Versailles Château Rive Gauche
Local services (RER C) Versailles-Chantiers – Massy-Palaiseau – Juvisy – Villeneuve-le-Roi – Invalides – Champs-de-Mars Tour Eiffel – Viroflay-Rive-Gauche – Versailles Château Rive Gauche

References

External links

 

Railway stations in Essonne
Réseau Express Régional stations
Railway stations in France opened in 1995